Prince Jerzy Ignacy Lubomirski (1687–1753) was a Polish nobleman (szlachcic). Knight of the Order of the White Eagle, awarded on 3 August 1727.

Lubomirski was owner of Rzeszów, Rozwadów and Żelechów estates. He was Field Writer of the Crown from 1726 until 1732, General of the Crown Army, General of Saxon Army, and Colonel of Horse Guards (Gwardia konna) in 1744. Since 1746 Grand Chorąży of the Crown.

Generals of the Polish–Lithuanian Commonwealth
1687 births
1753 deaths
Polish generals
Jerzy Ignacy
18th-century Polish–Lithuanian landowners
Polish courtiers